Kilanerin–Ballyfad GAA, often called simply Kilanerin, is a Gaelic football, hurling and ladies' Gaelic football club based in Kilanerin (Killinierin), County Wexford, Ireland.

History
There were formerly three clubs in the parish: Kilanerin, Ballyfad and Pallas Parnells. In 1953 they amalgamated with Tara Rocks to form Kilanerin–Ballyfad. The mountain on the club crest is nearby Annagh Hill.

Kilanerin took their first Wexford Senior Football Championship in 1974. Their grounds in the Borleagh townland were acquired after that, and were further developed in 1998.

Kilanerin won six county football titles in the years 1993–2008. Their best season was 1996, when they reached the semi-finals of the Leinster Senior Club Football Championship, losing to St. Sylvesters.

Since then, they have been county finalists twice, in 2010 and 2018.

Honours

 Wexford Senior Football Championship (7): 1974, 1993, 1995, 1997, 1999, 2003, 2008
 Leinster Intermediate Club Football Championship (1): 2017
 South Leinster Senior Club Championship (1): 1999
 Wexford Intermediate Football Championship (2): 1973, 1992
 Wexford Junior Football Championship: (1) 1967
 Wexford Junior Hurling Championship: (1) 1998

Notable players
Michael W. D'Arcy
Mattie Forde
John Hegarty, won the Wexford SFC with the club as player-manager

References

External links
Official site

Gaelic games clubs in County Wexford
Gaelic football clubs in County Wexford
Hurling clubs in County Wexford